National Route 139 is a national highway of Japan connecting Fuji, Shizuoka and Okutama, Tokyo in Japan, with a total length of 134.4 km (83.51 mi).

References

139
Former toll roads in Japan
Roads in Shizuoka Prefecture
Roads in Tokyo
Roads in Yamanashi Prefecture